Olivia Josephine Graham (born 21 June 1956) is a British bishop. She has served as Bishop of Reading, a suffragan bishop  in the Diocese of Oxford, since 2019. She was previously Archdeacon of Berkshire in the same diocese from 2013 to 2019.

Early life and education
Graham was born on 21 June 1956. She was educated at Cobham Hall School, an all-girls private school in Cobham, Kent, and at Stake Farm College, also in Kent.

From 1974 to 1981, she was a teacher in Africa. She then returned to England to study at the University of East Anglia, graduating with a Bachelor of Arts (BA) degree in 1984. She moved into international development; working for the United Nations from 1984 to 1986 and for Oxfam from 1986 to 1993.

Ordained ministry
Graham trained for ordained ministry on the St Albans and Oxford Ministry Course, from 1994 to 1997, completing a Certificate of Theology (CTh). She was made deacon at Michaelmas 1997 (5 October), by Richard Harries, Bishop of Oxford, at Christ Church Cathedral, Oxford, and ordained priest the following Michaelmas (4 October 1998) by Mike Hill, area Bishop of Buckingham, at All Saints', High Wycombe. She was appointed Archdeacon of Berkshire in 2013.

Episcopal ministry
On 15 July 2019, it was announced that Graham was to become Bishop of Reading, a suffragan bishop of the Diocese of Oxford. On 19 November 2019, she was consecrated a bishop by Justin Welby during a service at St Paul's Cathedral. As area bishop, she oversees the Reading episcopal area: this is identical to the Archdeaconry of Berkshire she previously oversaw as archdeacon.

Views
In November 2022, Graham tweeted that she agreed with Steven Croft's call that clergy in the Church of England should be free to bless or marry same-sex partners and to enter into a same-sex marriage themselves; this is in contrast to the Church's current official position.

Personal life
In 1989, Graham married Keith Malcolm Glenny. Together they have three children: one daughter and two sons.

References

1956 births
Living people
People educated at Cobham Hall School
Alumni of the University of East Anglia
Archdeacons of Berkshire
Bishops of Reading
Women Anglican bishops